The Confessions is a 2016 thriller drama film directed by Roberto Andò. It stars Toni Servillo, Connie Nielsen, Pierfrancesco Favino, Marie-Josée Croze, Moritz Bleibtreu, Lambert Wilson and Daniel Auteuil.

Plot
A G8 meeting is being held at the luxury Grand Hotel in Heiligendamm on the Mecklenburg Baltic coast in Germany. The world's most powerful economists are gathered to enact important provisions that will deeply influence the world economy.

One of the guests is a mysterious Italian monk, invited by Daniel Roché, the director of the International Monetary Fund. He wants the monk to receive his confession, that night, in secret. The next morning, Roché is found dead.

Cast
Toni Servillo as Roberto Salus
Daniel Auteuil as Daniel Roché
Pierfrancesco Favino as Italian minister
Moritz Bleibtreu as Mark Klein
Connie Nielsen as Claire Seth
Marie-Josée Croze as Canadian minister
Lambert Wilson as Roché's lover 
Richard Sammel as German minister
Johan Heldenbergh as Michael Wintzl
Togo Igawa as Japanese minister
Aleksei Guskov as Russian minister
Stéphane Freiss as French minister
Julian Ovenden as Matthew Price
Andy de la Tour as UK minister

Accolades

References

External links 
 

2016 films
2016 thriller drama films
2010s English-language films
Films directed by Roberto Andò
Films set in Germany
Films set in hotels
Films shot in France
Films shot in Germany
Films shot in Rome
2010s French-language films
French thriller drama films
2010s German-language films
2010s Italian-language films
Italian thriller drama films
Films scored by Nicola Piovani
2010s French films
2010s Italian films